Shantou, China usually refers to Shantou (汕头), a Prefecture-level city in Guangdong Province.

But several other places bear the same name, including:

 (山头镇), a township-level division in Anhui Province.

Shantou may also refer to:
 Shantou (horse), a racehorse

See also